Popular monarchy is a term used by Kingsley Martin (1936) for monarchical titles referring to a people rather than a territory. 
This was the norm in classical antiquity and throughout much of the Middle Ages, and such titles were retained in some of the monarchies of 19th- and 20th-century Europe.

During the French Revolution Louis XVI had to change his title to indicate he was "king of the French" rather than "king of France", paralleling the title of "king of the Franks" (rex Francorum) used in medieval France.

Currently, Belgium has the only explicit popular monarchy, the formal title of its king being King of the Belgians rather than King of Belgium.

List of royal and imperial titles

See also
Revolutions of 1830
Pater Patriae

Notes

Monarchy
Monarchy
Royal titles